Dilmeshwar is a village in the Karmala taluka of Solapur district in Maharashtra state, India.

Demographics
Covering  and comprising 70 households at the time of the 2011 census of India, Dilmeshwar had a population of 327. There were 173 males and 154 females, with 35 people being aged six or younger.

References

Villages in Karmala taluka